ŽS series 812 (former JŽ series 812) was a diesel motor railbus operated by Serbian Railways. Originally it was the German Uerdingen railbus produced by Goša FOM for Yugoslav Railways (JŽ).

History
In the early 1950s, Yugoslav Railways decided to import a large number of diesel multiple units for traffic on local railway lines. The decision was made on the Uerdinger Schienenbus VT 95 series. The first multiple units in red livery arrived in 1955, and by 1959 there were 40 in service. Having performed well in service it was decided to purchase the license for mass production. The production started at Goša FOM wagon factory from Smederevska Palanka and the first domestic-made railbuses were delivered to Yugoslav Railways in silver livery. A total of 270 diesel multiple units were produced by Goša FOM until 1969, which contributed to the replacement of steam locomotives in local passenger traffic.

Name
The official name of VT 95 series with Yugoslav Railways was JŽ series 812. In the 1A+2 configuration when two motor cars are connected so one is pulling another as a wagon, the DMU is known as JŽ 812/816. This configuration is basic but it was rarely used due to the small number of passengers.

The first nickname was "Silver Arrow" (Serbo-Croatian: Srebrna strela/ Сребрна стрела) due to its silver livery. It was so much faster than the old steam locomotives, the railwaymen nicknamed it "Rabbit" (Serbo-Croatian: Zec/ Зец). Because of its German origin, it is nicknamed by passengers as Schienenbus (Serbo-Croatian: Šinobus/ Шинобус), which is widely known among the people of former Yugoslavia.

Service
Šinobus was operated by Serbian Railways (ŽS) on several local lines until 2016, mainly in Vojvodina. Due to their age, ŽS class 812 were replaced by the new ŽS series 711 diesel multiple units. There are some 30 railbuses in inventory but only five or six are operational.

A number of JŽ series 812 have been operated by Croatian Railways (HŽ) as HŽ series 7221 but they are no longer in service.

It stands for one of the most popular railway vehicles in the former Yugoslavia.

Gallery

References

External links

SINOBUS - the only website dedicated to the DMU 812

812
Train-related introductions in 1955
1955 in rail transport